Princess Zofia Ostrogska (1595–1622) was a Polish–Lithuanian noblewoman of Ruthenian origin, known as the heiress of one of the greatest fortunes in Poland. She was the wealthiest woman in Poland.

She married Stanisław Lubomirski in 1613. Through this marriage he became an owner of 18 towns, 313 villages and 163 granges in the provinces of Kraków, Sandomierz, Ruthenia and Volhynia.

References

1595 births
1622 deaths
Zofia Ostrogska
Polish–Lithuanian Commonwealth people